Mist is a weather phenomenon similar to fog.

Mist, MIST or The Mist may also refer to:

Education 
 Masdar Institute of Science and Technology, an ecologically-focused university in Masdar City, UAE
 Mbeya Institute of Science and Technology, Tanzania
 Military Institute of Science and Technology, an engineering institute in Bangladesh
 Master of Information Science and Technology, a postgraduate degree
 Musashi International School Tokyo, Mitaka, Tokyo

Fiction
 Mist (novel), a 1914 novel by Spanish author Miguel de Unamuno
 The Mist (novella), a 1980 horror novella by American author Stephen King
 Mist (Guardians of Ga'Hoole), fantasy book series
 Mist (comics), a supervillain of Starman comics
 Mist (valkyrie), a valkyrie in Norse mythology

Film and television
Mist (1967 film), South Korean film
 Moodu Pani, 1980 Indian thriller with the English-language title The Mist
 Mist (1988 film), a Turkish film
 Mist: The Tale of a Sheepdog Puppy, 2006 British television film
 The Mist (film), 2007 film based on The Mist by Stephen King
 The Mist (TV series), 2017 U.S. TV series based on the 2007 film

Games 
 MIST (MUD), a public-access Multi-user Dungeon (MUD) computer game
 Mist (Legend of Legaia), video game for PlayStation

Other
 Muslim Interscholastic Tournament, a tournament for high-school students in the United States, Canada and the UK
 MIST (economic term), an acronym for Mexico, Indonesia, South Korea and Turkey
 MIST (Satellite), Swedish satellite
 Mist, Oregon, an unincorporated community in Columbia County, Oregon
 Mist, California, the former name of Bailey Flats, California, a former town in the United States
 , the name of more than one United States Navy ship
 Mist (rapper), a musician from Birmingham, United Kingdom
 Magnetosphere Ionosphere and Solar-Terrestrial group, a physical sciences community based in the U.K. associated with the Royal Astronomical Society

See also 
 Myst, a graphic adventure/puzzle video game
 
 
 Mister (disambiguation)
 Misty (disambiguation)